EROI or the Eastman Rochester Organ Initiative is a project run by the Eastman School of Music with the goal of creating a unique collection of organ instruments in Rochester, New York.

The Italian Baroque organ

The first milestone of the project was the acquisition of an original Italian baroque organ. The instrument was restored by German organbuilder Gerhard Woehl and installed in the Fountain Court of the Memorial Art Gallery, a museum of University of Rochester.

The instrument has one manual, pull down pedals and is tuned in meantone.

The Casparini Organ

The second instrument is a replica of the 1776 organ built by German organ builder Adam Gottlob Casparini for the Church of the Holy Ghost in Vilnius, Lithuania. The replica was built by the GOArt research center and is installed in Christ Church, Rochester, New York. The dedication took place in October 2008 during the yearly EROI festival. Munetaka Yokota was responsible for the voicing of the pipes and Monika May oversaw the painting and gilding of the case.

 Two tremulants
 II/I shove coupler
 1/Pedall coupler (added)
 Gwiazdy (Cymbelstern)
 Vox Campanorum (Glockenspiel g0-d3)
 Bebny (drum stop)
 Calcant
 Pitch: A4=465 Hz
 Temperament: Modified Neidhart 1732, Dorf

Hook and Hastings opus 1573

In the fall of 2012 an 1893 organ by Hook and Hastings was installed in Christ Church and inaugurated on November 30 with a recital of music by Johann Sebastian Bach, Camille Saint-Saëns and David Conte among others.

The Ernest Skinner organ

The restoration of the 1921 Ernest Skinner organ in Kilbourn Hall, Eastman School of Music is also part of the project.

References

External links
 Official website

University of Rochester